Santo Niño, officially the Municipality of Santo Niño, is a 5th class municipality in the province of Samar, Philippines. According to the 2020 census, it has a population of 12,519 people.

In between those two islands is the smaller Pilar Island. The municipality's poblacion (town center) is located in Santo Niño Island.

History
This town has an ancient Bisayan name Limbankawayan which derived from the word limba meaning red and kawayan means bamboo thus a red colored bamboo (phyllostachys iridescens) which is abundant during those days.

It was separated from Calbayog and made a pueblo and a parish by a Royal Decree of September 29, 1898. The Bishop of Cebu had recommended in 1895 that it achieve parish status, though final approval and confirmation was not relayed from Madrid through Manila until the year 1897.

Geography

Santo Niño Island

 Baras
 Basud (Poblacion)
 Buenavista
 Cabunga-an
 Ilijan
 Ilo (Poblacion)
 Takut

Camandag Island
The circular Camandag Island is located north of Santo Niño Island, about  shore to shore.
 Balatguti 
 Corocawayan 
 Lobelobe
 Pinanangnan  (JMBere Coco+Cacao Farms)
 Sevilla
 Villahermosa

Pilar Island

Barangays

Santo Niño is politically subdivided into 13 barangays.

 Balatguti
 Baras
 Basud (Poblacion)
 Buenavista
 Cabunga-an
 Corocawayan
 Ilijan
 Ilo (Poblacion)
 Lobelobe
 Pinanangnan
 Sevilla
 Takut
 Villahermosa

Climate

Demographics

Economy

Transportation
There are no airports on the islands of Santo Niño and Camandag.  The islands are reached by boats from the Port of Calbayog.

See also
 List of islands of the Philippines

References

External links
 Santo Niño Profile at PhilAtlas.com
 [ Philippine Standard Geographic Code]
 Philippine Census Information
 Local Governance Performance Management System

Municipalities of Samar (province)
Island municipalities in the Philippines